The St. Louis administrative region of the Missouri Department of Conservation encompasses Crawford, Franklin, Jefferson, Lincoln, St. Charles, St. Louis, Warren, and Washington counties. The regional conservation office is in St. Charles.

Notes 

 Acreage and counties from MDCLand GIS file
 Names, descriptions, and locations from Conservation Atlas Online GIS file

References 

 
 

St. Louis region